Westdene is a suburb of the city of Bloemfontein in South Africa.

References

Suburbs of Bloemfontein